The Town Life is an Italian microcar. The vehicle was created by the Tonino Lamborghini Group, a company run by the son of Ferruccio Lamborghini, who sold the company in 2001.

There is no relation between this company and the more famous Lamborghini other than trademarks.

Examples of the Town Life and golf carts produced by the Tonino Lamborghini Group are displayed at the Lamborghini museum, Centro Polifunzionale Ferruccio Lamborghini.

History
This vehicle was first displayed at the 1999 Bologna Motor Show by the Tonino Lamborghini Group. A company, Town Life S.p.A., was created to manufacture this car, and a plant was purchased from the bankrupt ISO company in Magione.

Models

Two versions are available: the Ginevra has a 505cc gasoline or a 505cc diesel engine, and the Helektra which comes with an electric motor. Both a coupe and convertible version of this fiberglass body vehicle are listed as available.

It can be driven by people as young as 14 in Italy using a moped license.

A high performance version, the Ginevra GTB Sport, was announced in 2006.

In 2010, the Tonino Lamborghini Group announced plans to build electric cars in Montenegro.

References

External links
 Tonino Lamborghini's Official Site.
 Town Life's Official Site.

Town
Car manufacturers of Italy
Electric vehicle manufacturers of Italy
Cars introduced in 1999